Jesper Wallstedt (born November 14, 2002) is a Swedish professional ice hockey goaltender who currently plays for the Iowa Wild in the American Hockey League (AHL) as a prospect to the Minnesota Wild in the National Hockey League (NHL). Wallstedt was drafted by the Wild in the first round, 20th overall, in the 2021 NHL Entry Draft.

Playing career
Wallstedt played junior hockey with his hometown club Västerås IK before joining the Luleå HF organization for the 2018–19 season. Wallstedt made his SHL debut during the 2019–20 SHL season, playing in a game against HV71. He entered in the second period of the game in relief of David Rautio, and allowed one goal as Luleå fell to HV71 by a score of 2–1.

On 17 May 2022, Wallstedt was signed by the Minnesota Wild to a three-year, entry-level contract.

On 12 November 2022, Wallstedt recorded his first North American win, along with scoring an empty net goal, to secure a 5–2 Iowa Wild win over the Chicago Wolves.

Career statistics

Regular season and playoffs

International

References

External links

2002 births
Living people
Iowa Wild players
Luleå HF players
Minnesota Wild draft picks
National Hockey League first-round draft picks
Sportspeople from Västerås
Swedish ice hockey goaltenders
VIK Västerås HK players
21st-century Swedish people